KBFR (95.3 FM), also known as Boulder Free Radio, was a pirate radio (unlicensed, underground) station broadcasting from Boulder, Colorado, United States.

History
Boulder Free Radio operated from March 2000 to January 2005 at 95.3 FM.  Its power is similar to an LPFM station, approx 150 watts.

KBFR was founded by a pirate radio operator calling himself Monk. Monk still maintains an occasionally updated blog about KBFR and pirate radio called Courage, Truth & Booty.

References

External links
 The Boulder Weekly's comprehensive article on KBFR shortly after the first shutdown (archive.org snapshot). 
 Boulder Weekly follow-up article from July 2002

Pirate radio stations in the United States
BFR
Radio stations disestablished in 2005
Radio stations established in 2000
2000 establishments in Colorado
2005 disestablishments in Colorado
BFR
Defunct radio stations in the United States